Do Fish Do It? is a 2002 German drama film directed by Almut Getto.

Cast 
 Tino Mewes – Jan
  – Nina
  – Hanno
  – Lena
  – Opa
 Ellen ten Damme – Caro
 Jürgen Tonkel – Wolf
  – Angel

References

External links 

2002 drama films
2002 films
German drama films
HIV/AIDS in German films
2000s German films